Renville County is a county in the U.S. state of Minnesota. As of the 2020 census the population was 14,723. Its county seat is Olivia.

History
The Minnesota Territory legislature created the county on February 20, 1855. It was named for Joseph Renville, a fur trapper, trader, British officer in the War of 1812, and interlocutor with local Native American groups. Organization of the county's governing structure was completed on November 8, 1866, with Beaver Falls as county seat. Beginning in 1885, citizens in and around Olivia began pressing for the seat to be moved to Olivia, which happened in 1900.

Renville County was the site of several engagements in the Dakota War of 1862, most notably the Battle of Birch Coulee. The burned-out Joseph Brown House Ruins still stand, and various monuments throughout the County memorialize settlers killed in the conflict.

Geography
The Minnesota River flows southeast along the county's southwestern border. Hawk Creek flows south through the county's western end, discharging into the Minnesota. Beaver Creek drains the central part of the county, flowing southeast before turning southwest to discharge into the Minnesota. The county terrain consists of rolling hills etched by drainages and sprinkled with lakes and ponds. The area is devoted to agriculture. The county terrain slopes to the south, with its highest point near the midpoint of the northern border, at 1,122' (342m) ASL.

Major highways

  U.S. Highway 71
  U.S. Highway 212
  Minnesota State Highway 4
  Minnesota State Highway 19
  Minnesota State Highway 23

Adjacent counties

 Kandiyohi County - north
 Meeker County - northeast
 McLeod County - east
 Sibley County - southeast
 Nicollet County - southeast
 Brown County - south
 Redwood County - southwest
 Yellow Medicine County - west
 Chippewa County - northwest

Renville, Beltrami, and Stearns are Minnesota's only counties that abut nine other counties.

Lakes

 Beckendorf Lake
 Boon Lake
 Hodgson Lake
 Lake Allie
 Mud Lake
 Phare Lake
 Preston Lake
 Round Grove Lake (part)
 Round Lake

Protected areas

 Beaver Falls County Park
 Camp Town Park
 County Park No. 2
 County Park No. 4
 Fort Ridgely State Park (part)
 Prieve State Wildlife Management Area (part)
 Skalbekken County Park

Demographics

2000 census
As of the 2000 census, there were 17,154 people, 6,779 households, and 4,623 families in the county. The population density was 17.5/sqmi (6.74/km2). There were 7,413 housing units at an average density of 7.54/sqmi (2.91/km2). The racial makeup of the county was 95.72% White, 0.06% Black or African American, 0.51% Native American, 0.20% Asian, 0.02% Pacific Islander, 2.77% from other races, and 0.73% from two or more races. 5.11% of the population were Hispanic or Latino of any race. 50.9% were of German, 16.3% Norwegian and 5.1% Swedish ancestry.

There were 6,779 households, out of which 31.50% had children under the age of 18 living with them, 59.10% were married couples living together, 5.60% had a female householder with no husband present, and 31.80% were non-families. 28.50% of all households were made up of individuals, and 15.10% had someone living alone who was 65 years of age or older. The average household size was 2.48 and the average family size was 3.05.

The county population contained 26.50% under the age of 18, 6.60% from 18 to 24, 25.30% from 25 to 44, 21.70% from 45 to 64, and 19.80% who were 65 years of age or older. The median age was 40 years. For every 100 females there were 99.30 males. For every 100 females age 18 and over, there were 98.50 males.

The median income for a household in the county was $37,652, and the median income for a family was $45,065. Males had a median income of $30,473 versus $22,179 for females. The per capita income for the county was $17,770. About 6.30% of families and 8.80% of the population were below the poverty line, including 10.80% of those under age 18 and 8.10% of those age 65 or over.

2020 Census

Communities

Cities

 Bird Island
 Buffalo Lake
 Danube
 Fairfax
 Franklin
 Hector
 Morton
 Olivia (county seat)
 Renville
 Sacred Heart

Unincorporated communities
 Beaver Falls
 Bechyn
 Churchill
 Lakeside

Ghost town
Vicksburg

Townships

 Bandon Township
 Beaver Falls Township
 Birch Cooley Township
 Bird Island Township
 Boon Lake Township
 Brookfield Township
 Cairo Township
 Camp Township
 Crooks Township
 Emmet Township
 Ericson Township
 Flora Township
 Hawk Creek Township
 Hector Township
 Henryville Township
 Kingman Township
 Martinsburg Township
 Melville Township
 Norfolk Township
 Osceola Township
 Palmyra Township
 Preston Lake Township
 Sacred Heart Township
 Troy Township
 Wang Township
 Wellington Township
 Winfield Township

Politics
Before 1996, Renville County was a fairly balanced precinct. Since 1996, only Republican Party candidates have received the county vote in national elections (as of 2020).

See also
 National Register of Historic Places listings in Renville County, Minnesota

References

External links
 Renville County government’s website

 
Minnesota counties
1866 establishments in Minnesota
Populated places established in 1866